Dunewood is a small beach community in the western end of Fire Island, New York State.  With about 100 homes originally all built on an identical floor plan, While the community specifically does not market itself to tourists and short-term renters, it is a popular location for long-term residents, and properties are rarely for sale. The community has only very limited facilities, and while during summertime, it shares a doctor with nearby Fair Harbor, during other times of the year, serious medical cases have to be medevaced by helicopter.

Dunewood, like many neighboring communities, suffers from coastal erosion, which the community in the early 2000s was attempting to control via beach replenishment, the sand replacement funded by taxes levied through each community's erosion control district. Environmental concerns have however hindered similar projects on Fire Island for decades.

Dunewood Yacht Club

The Dunewood Yacht Club  (DYC) is a staple of Dunewood and of the larger Fire Island community.  It offers a long tradition of sailing instruction for a wide range of ages and all skill levels.  The Yacht Club offers instruction on Sunfish sailing dinghies. After passing a swim test, students are assigned to a specific class based on age.

References

External links
Dunewood, Fire Island
Fire Island Travel Guide
Fire Island on Facebook
Dunewood Yacht Club

Fire Island, New York
Islip (town), New York
Beaches of Suffolk County, New York
Hamlets in Suffolk County, New York
Populated coastal places in New York (state)